Charles Phillip Johnson (January 18, 1836 - May 21, 1920) was an American politician and attorney who served as Missouri lieutenant governor from 1873 until 1875.

Biography
Johnson was born in Lebanon, Illinois on January 18, 1836. His maternal grandparents were from Virginia.  His mother was born in Mississippi River island community of Kaskaskia, Illinois.  His father was born in Philadelphia.  He briefly attended McKendree College.

Johnson had been a newspaper editor for two years before he took up the study of law.  Four years later he became city attorney in St. Louis.  Johnson had helped organize Missouri troops for the Union cause during the Civil War.  He served in the Missouri legislature before and after his term as lieutenant governor.  In the 1880s, when the James–Younger Gang was breaking up, the strong Union-supporter Johnson was one of the defense attorneys for Frank James.  Johnson taught law at Washington University for many years.

He died at his son's home in St. Louis on May 21, 1920. He was buried at Bellefontaine Cemetery.

References

External links
 

1836 births
1920 deaths
Lieutenant Governors of Missouri
Missouri lawyers
Missouri Republicans
19th-century American lawyers
Burials at Bellefontaine Cemetery
Washington University in St. Louis faculty